Richard Henry may refer to:

 Richard Henry (pseudonym), pseudonym credited on collaborative works of authors Richard Butler and Henry Chance Newton
 Richard Bullock Henry (1930–2010), black activist better known as Imari Obadele
 Richard Henry (conservationist) (1845–1929), New Zealand naturalist and conservationist
 Richard C. Henry (born 1925), United States Air Force general
 Richard Conn Henry (born 1940), professor of physics and astronomy at Johns Hopkins University

See also